These are the international rankings of the Dominican Republic

Economy

 World Economic Forum Global Competitiveness Report ranked    95 out of 133

Politics

 Transparency International  Corruption Perceptions Index ranked   99 out of 180

Society 

 Institute for Economics and Peace Global Peace Index ranked 70 out of 144
 United Nations Development Programme| Human Development Index ranked  90 out of 182

References

Dominican Republic